The 1980 Washington gubernatorial election was held on November 4, 1980. Incumbent Democratic Governor Dixy Lee Ray ran for a second term, but lost in the primary to State Representative Jim McDermott. McDermott was defeated in the general election by Republican candidate John Spellman, the King County Executive. , this is the last time a Republican was elected Governor of Washington,  thus beginning the longest streak for Democrats in any gubernatorial office in the United States.

Blanket primary

Candidates

Democratic
Jim McDermott, psychiatrist, state senator, and candidate for governor in 1972
Dixy Lee Ray, incumbent Governor of Washington
Caroline "Hope" Diamond

Republican
John Spellman, King County Executive
Duane Berentson, state speaker
Bruce Chapman, state secretary
Patrick Sean McGowan

Results

General election

Candidates
Jim McDermott (D), psychiatrist, state senator, and candidate for governor in 1972
John Spellman (R), King County Executive

Results

References

1980
1980 United States gubernatorial elections
Gubernatorial